Mihail Gerdzhikov (1877–1947) was a Bulgarian revolutionary and anarchist.

Biography

He was born in Plovdiv, then in the Ottoman Empire, in 1877. He studied at the French College in Plovdiv, where he received the nickname Michel.  As a student in 1893 he started his revolutionary activities as the leader of a Macedonian Secret Revolutionary Committee (MSRC).

In Lausanne and Geneva he participated in the so-called Geneva Group. In 1899 he returned to the Bulgarian lands and became a teacher at Bulgarian Classical High School in Bitola and joined IMORO, where Gerdzhikov approached Gotse Delchev. In 1900 he was a delegate to the Zlatitsa Society of the Seventh Macedonian Congress.

In April 1901 he was a delegate of the Borisov Society to the Eighth Macedonian-Edirne Congress.

After the defeat of the Strandzha commune he dealt with the accommodation of the rebels who withdrew to Bulgaria. He published articles in the Bulgarian and foreign press, appealing to the international community for intervention in the resolution of the Eastern question in the Balkans. Together with Varban Kilifarski he also published various newspapers of their own.

At the outbreak of the Balkan War in 1912, Gerdzhikov headed the Lozengrad guerrilla unit of the Macedonian-Adrianopolitan Volunteer Corps.

After the War, he renewed his contacts with the Inner Macedonian Revolutionary Organization, but no longer played an active role in it. Gerdzhikov participated in the Constantinople Conference of the IMRO in 1930 and was a member of the Central Committee as a member of the Foreign Office. But after the conference he did not leave for Berlin, to participate in the Central Committee, but returned to Bulgaria in 1931.

He became a journalist and translator. On the eve and during the Second World War, 1939–1945, due to his advanced age, he was mainly engaged in journalism. He has collaborated on a number of periodicals. Although some of his associates were involved in the resistance movement, Gerdzhikov remained aloof, although he maintained ties with them. Following the September 9 coup, he signed in Sofia "Appeal to the Macedonians in Bulgaria".

Sources

1877 births
1947 deaths
Anarcho-communists
Bulgarian anarchists
Bulgarian educators
Bulgarian military personnel of the Balkan Wars
Bulgarian military personnel of World War I
Bulgarian revolutionaries
Burials at Central Sofia Cemetery
Internal Macedonian Revolutionary Organization (United) members
Members of the Internal Macedonian Revolutionary Organization
Politicians from Plovdiv
Thracian Bulgarians